Einat Yaron (born 11 November 1973) is an Israeli judoka.

She won a bronze medal at the 1995 European Judo Championships in Birmingham.

References

External links
 
 
 

1973 births
Living people
Israeli female judoka
Jewish martial artists
Jewish Israeli sportspeople
Israeli female athletes
Israeli Jews